The Honourable Robert James Webster (born 16 September 1951) is an Australian company director and grazier and a former New South Wales parliamentarian.

Early life
Webster was born in Sydney and attended Newington College (1963-1969), commencing as a preparatory school student in Wyvern House. From 1970 until his election to State parliament he was a grazier at Salisbury Downs, a property near Bigga.

Parliamentary career
Webster represented Goulburn for the National Party in the NSW Legislative Assembly from March 1984 until May 1991 when he was elected as a member of the Legislative Council where he served until retiring from politics in 1995. During his parliamentary career he served as Minister for Administrative Services and Assistant Minister for Transport, Minister for Family and Community Services and Minister for Administrative Services, Minister for Planning, Minister for Energy, Minister for State Development and Minister for Tourism, and finally as Minister for Planning and Minister for Housing. While in Parliament, Webster was a member of the National Party but since 1996 has been a member of the Liberal Party.

Business career
He is a former Executive Director of the International Banks and Securities Association of Australia and is now a Director of Korn Ferry International and Chair of the Board at Endeavour Energy.

Community service
Between 1997 and 2004 he served a Chairman of the National Science & Technology Centre, Questacon. He is currently chairman of ANZ Stadium's Advisory Board and a member of Newington College Council.

References

1951 births
Living people
Members of the New South Wales Legislative Assembly
Members of the New South Wales Legislative Council
National Party of Australia members of the Parliament of New South Wales
People educated at Newington College
Members of Newington College Council
Politicians from Sydney